|}

The Paradise Stakes is a Listed flat horse race in Great Britain open to horses aged four years or older. It is run at Ascot over a distance of 1 mile, and it is scheduled to take place each year in April.

The race was first run, as the Chobham Conditions Stakes, in 1995.  It was given its current name and awarded Listed status in 2004.

Since 2019 the official title has indicated that the race should be considered as a trial for the Queen Anne Stakes, run at the Royal Meeting over the same course and distance in June.

The race title was originally used for a different race, now called the Sagaro Stakes, which is run at the same Ascot meeting.

Winners

See also
Horse racing in Great Britain
List of British flat horse races

References

Racing Post:

Flat races in Great Britain
Ascot Racecourse
Open mile category horse races
1995 establishments in England
Recurring sporting events established in 1995